Weed Crossroad, also known as Weed or Weedville, is an unincorporated community in Crenshaw County, Alabama, United States.

References

Unincorporated communities in Crenshaw County, Alabama
Unincorporated communities in Alabama